Alberto Heredia may refer to:
 Alberto Heredia (footballer)
 Alberto Heredia (sculptor)